Holle may refer to:

 Holle, village in Germany
 "Mother Holle", Frau Holle (literally Mrs. Holle), a German fairy tale
 Holle (surname)